The Indonesian motorcycle Grand Prix is a motorcycling event that is part of the Grand Prix motorcycle racing World Championship. There have been three Grand Prix events held; in 1996 and 1997, both at the Sentul International Circuit, Bogor, West Java, and in 2022 at the Mandalika International Street Circuit, Central Lombok, West Nusa Tenggara.
	
As a response to the 1997 Asian financial crisis, this race was dropped from the 1998 calendar.
			
In February 2019, it was announced that the Indonesian GP would return in 2021 to be held at the Mandalika International Street Circuit, then under construction in the Mandalika resort area of Central Lombok Regency, West Nusa Tenggara. The track, claimed to be a street circuit, is the first in Grand Prix motorcycle racing since the Brno Circuit last staged a Grand Prix as a street circuit in 1986. The Grand Prix races were subsequently postponed until 2022 due to the COVID-19 pandemic.

Pertamina is the title sponsor of this event until 2024.

Official names and sponsors
1996–1997: Marlboro Indonesian Grand Prix
2022–present: Pertamina Grand Prix of Indonesia

Winners of the Indonesian motorcycle Grand Prix

Multiple winners (manufacturers)

Multiple winners (countries)

By year

References

 
M
Recurring sporting events established in 1996
1996 establishments in Indonesia